Kochiura is a genus of comb-footed spiders that was first described by Allan Frost Archer in 1950.

Species
 it contains eight species, found in Europe, Africa, Brazil, Chile, and Iran:
Kochiura attrita (Nicolet, 1849) – Chile, Juan Fernandez Is.
Kochiura aulica (C. L. Koch, 1838) (type) – Cape Verde Is., Canary Is., North Africa, Europe, Turkey, Caucasus, Iran
Kochiura casablanca (Levi, 1963) – Chile
Kochiura decolorata (Keyserling, 1886) – Brazil
Kochiura ocellata (Nicolet, 1849) – Chile
Kochiura olaup (Levi, 1963) – Brazil
Kochiura rosea (Nicolet, 1849) – Chile, Juan Fernandez Is.
Kochiura temuco (Levi, 1963) – Chile

Formerly included:
K. episinoides (Levi, 1963) (Transferred to Chrosiothes)

In synonymy:
K. bucculenta (Nicolet, 1849) = Kochiura rosea (Nicolet, 1849)
K. chiloensis  = Kochiura ocellata (Nicolet, 1849)
K. foliacea  = Kochiura rosea (Nicolet, 1849)
K. gracilis (Keyserling, 1884) = Kochiura rosea (Nicolet, 1849)
K. levipes  = Kochiura attrita (Nicolet, 1849)
K. opima  = Kochiura rosea (Nicolet, 1849)
K. rubicunda  = Kochiura rosea (Nicolet, 1849)
K. virgulata  = Kochiura ocellata (Nicolet, 1849)

See also
 List of Theridiidae species

References

Araneomorphae genera
Spiders of Asia
Spiders of South America
Theridiidae